Gérard Gropaiz (1 August 1943 in Paris – 6 October 2012) was a French swimmer who competed at the 1960 Summer Olympics and in the 1964 Summer Olympics.

References

1943 births
2012 deaths
Swimmers from Paris
French male freestyle swimmers
Olympic swimmers of France
Swimmers at the 1960 Summer Olympics
Swimmers at the 1964 Summer Olympics
European Aquatics Championships medalists in swimming
Mediterranean Games gold medalists for France
Swimmers at the 1963 Mediterranean Games
Mediterranean Games medalists in swimming
20th-century French people
21st-century French people